Daniel Owusu Asiamah is a Ghanaian missionary and preacher of the Churches of Christ. He is the lead preacher of Takoradi Church of Christ and the founder of Outreach Africa Vocational Institute (OAVI).

An only child for his mother (father is deceased), he was born in Ghana on June 8, 1965. Asiamah is a product of Ghana Bible College, International School of Biblical Studies (South Africa), Southern California School of Evangelism (USA), Literacy International (USA), Haggai Institute (Hawaii, USA) and Freed Hardeman University (USA) free non certificated lectures/seminars.

In July 2019, he was among the ten finalists of MTN Heroes Of Change. He also serves as the Director of Studies at Takoradi Bible College. Asiamah is the host of television Bible program called Voice of the church on Adom TV(Ghana). Asiamah has similar radio programs in the US, Canada and a number of European countries. He has traveled extensively around the world to either start new churches or encouraging Christians through seminars, lectureships, public evangelism etc.

Through his Outreach Africa Ministry Dan Asiamah has impacted several towns and villages in Ghana by providing the poor and needy with water wells, food, clothing, cash donations and education. Through the same outreach program, he has provided completely free vocational education to people in and around Takoradi Municipality to equip them become independent in society. Since the inception of the school in February 2008, about 2000 people have graduated. Asiamah is a true believer in giving to the needy in society and patriotism, a belief which stems from his humble beginnings and struggles growing up in Ghana.

He was awarded an honorary Doctorate degree (Doctor in Divinity) in 2015 by the Los Angeles Development Institute in Los Angeles, USA. He was again awarded another honorary degree by the same institution in 2016 this time around, "Professor in Biblical Studies". He has more than 500 taped messages and no less than 1000 pages of religious and social journals.

References 

Ghanaian Christian missionaries
Living people
Year of birth missing (living people)
Place of birth missing (living people)
Ghanaian television presenters